'José Ángel Rosabal Fajardo', was born in Manzanillo, Cuba, in August 1935. 
He works in painting, drawing, engraving and even table design.
He was part of the group Diez Pintores Concretos.

Individual Exhibitions

He has had many exhibitions of his pieces. The first one was in 1959 named "Exposición Rosabal". Galería del Prado, Havana, Cuba. In 1972 he exhibited his works at the Oller Gallery, New York City, U.S.

Collective Exhibition
He was part of the group selected to participate in the Segunda Bienal Interamericana de México. Palacio de Bellas Artes, Museo Nacional de Arte Moderno, D.F., México, 1960. He was also a participant in the Third Latinamerican Engraving Contest celebrated at the Galería Latinoamericana, Casa de las Américas, Havana, Cuba, in 1964. A year later he was in the Second American Engraving Biennial  . Museo de Arte Contemporáneo, Universidad de Chile, Santiago de Chile, Chile.

Awards
He got a mention in the Third Latinamerican Engraving Contest, Galería Latinoamericana, Casa de las Américas, Havana, Cuba in 1964, and other prizes and honors in the same institution.

Collectiones
His works can be found among others in the Casa de las Américas (Havana) and in the Taller Experimental de Gráfica (TEG), both located in Havana, Cuba

References
 Pintores Cubanos, Editors Vicente Baez, Virilio Pinera, Calvert Casey, and Anton Arrufat; Ediciones Revolucion, Havana, Cuba 1962 
  Jose Veigas-Zamora, Cristina Vives Gutierrez, Adolfo V. Nodal, Valia Garzon, Dannys Montes de Oca; Memoria: Cuban Art of the 20th Century; (California/International Arts Foundation 2001);  
 Jose Viegas; Memoria: Artes Visuales Cubanas Del Siglo Xx; (California International Arts 2004);   

1935 births
Living people
Cuban contemporary artists